Balbidomaga is a genus of moths belonging to family Tortricidae.

Species
Balbidomaga dorophora Diakonoff, 1983
Balbidomaga uptoini Horak, 2006

See also
List of Tortricidae genera

References

External links
tortricidae.com

Tortricidae genera
Olethreutinae
Taxa named by Alexey Diakonoff